I'm Alive, I'm Dreaming is the third studio album by American electropop singer-songwriter The Ready Set. It was released on June 9, 2010 through Sire Records, Decaydance, and Beluga Heights. The album debuted at #3 on the Billboard Top Heatseekers chart. The first single from the album, "Love Like Woe", was released on March 29, 2010, and has sold over 1,000,000 downloads in the United States. The deluxe edition includes a re-recorded version of the song "Giants" from his self-released first album Tantrum Castle.

Singles
On March 29, 2010, Witzigreuter released his first single "Love Like Woe". The song peaked at number 27 on the Billboard Hot 100, number 1 on the Billboard Heatseeker Songs and number 30 on the Canada CHR/Top 40. This led to the song being certified platinum by RIAA and winning the BDS Certified Spin Award based on the 50,000 spins it received. The second single "More Than Alive", was released on May 25, 2010. The music video for both singles were directed by Isaac Ravishankara. "Stays Four The Same" was released as a promotional single in 2009.

Composition
Witzigreuter began writing the album in 2009 and features various sounds such as pop, techno and rock. Behind composing the album, he stated, "Some of the songs were recorded over a year ago, and then some of the songs were only recorded a few months ago." Witzigreuter also played every instrument on the record.

Reception

The album was given a 3.5 star rating from William Ruhlmann of AllMusic. He stated, "The Ready Set features bouncy beats and hooks aplenty on every tune, and the vocals are arranged just like those of a boy band." He also remarked, "Witzigreuter still doesn't have his craft quite down, but he's certainly on his way."

Commercial performance
The album debuted at number 3 on the Billboard Top Heatseekers chart and reached number 172 on the Billboard Current Album Sales chart. The album stayed 23 weeks on the Top Heatseekers chart. To support the album, the Ready Set announced his first headlining tour presented by Glamour Kills, that began in February 2011.

Track listing
The album is mixed by Jon Kaplan and mastered by Dave McNair.

Personnel
Credits for I'm Alive, I'm Dreaming adapted from AllMusic.

 Jordan Witzigreuter - bass, drums
 Craig Aaronson - A&R
 Jon Brown - engineering, producer
 Amy Dresser - cover illustration 
 Scott Frost - A&R
 Lucia Holm - photography
 Jon Kaplan - mixing 
 Emy Macek - producer
 Frank Maddocks - art direction, design
 Matthew Malpass - vocal engineer

 Dave McNair - mastering
 Kenneth Mount - engineering, producer
 Zack Odom - engineering, producer
 Donny Phillips - logo design
 J.R. Rotem - mixing, producer
 Dave Siegel - producer
 Matt Squire - producer
 Shane Stoner - producer
 Jonna Terrasi - producer
 Pete Wentz - A&R

Charts

References

2010 albums
Decaydance Records albums
Albums produced by J. R. Rotem
The Ready Set albums
Sire Records albums